A Magritte Award is an accolade presented by the Académie André Delvaux of Belgium to recognize cinematic achievement in the film industry. Modelled after the French César Award, the formal ceremony at which the awards are presented is one of the most prominent award ceremonies in Belgium. The various category winners are awarded a copy of a statuette. The awards, first presented in 2011, are considered the Belgian equivalent of the Academy Awards in the United States. 

Historically given during the first quarter of the new year, the awards honor achievements for cinematic accomplishments for the preceding year. The 12th Magritte Awards ceremony was held on 4 March 2023 at the Théâtre National, in the historic site of Marais-Jacqmain, Brussels.

History
Founded in 2010, the Académie André Delvaux was established at the request of the Francophone Film Producers Association (UPFF) and Pro Spère, to unite the five branches of the film industry, including actors, directors, producers, technicians and writers. The Académie aims to recognize excellence in Belgian cinematic achievements in order to have a Belgian counterpart to the César Awards of France. After the cancellation of the Joseph Plateau Awards ceremony, which was absorbed into the Film Fest Ghent in 2007, a national film award was missing in Belgium. This led the Académie André Delvaux to establish the Magritte Award. An accolade for artistic and technical merit in the Flemish film industry was launched a year earlier as part of the Ostend Film Festival and called Ensor Award.

The name of the award comes from the painter René Magritte. Charly Herscovici, who created the Magritte Foundation, allowed the Académie to use the name of the artist. The awarding statuette was created by designer and sculptor Xavier Lust, who drew inspiration from a poster entitled Moments inoubliables du cinema created by René Magritte in 1958 for a film festival. The 1st Magritte Awards ceremony took place on 5 February 2011 at the Square Meeting Centre in Brussels. During the ceremony, the Académie André Delvaux presented Magritte Awards in twenty categories. Film director Jaco Van Dormael presided the ceremony, while actress Helena Noguerra hosted the evening. The ceremony, televised in Belgium by BeTV, was produced by José Bouquiaux and directed by Vincent J. Gustin.

At the 2nd ceremony, held on 4 February 2012, the Magritte Award for Best Film in Coproduction was split in Best Foreign Film in Coproduction and Best Flemish Film in Coproduction. The latter was renamed Best Flemish Film in 2015. An Audience Award was presented to a Belgian film personality in 2011 and 2012, before being replaced by Best First Feature Film in 2013; its winner, however, was first announced during the 66th Cannes Film Festival, three months after the Magritte Awards ceremony. In 2016, it became a merit category, with the audience award being finally retired. The same year, Best Short Film was split in Best Live Action Short Film and Best Animated Short Film. The 8th ceremony was the first to be aired on La Deux, after RTBF took over broadcast rights from BeTV.

Rules and voting
The Académie André Delvaux, a professional honorary organization, maintains a voting membership of 800 as of 2015. It is divided into different branches, with each representing a different discipline in film production. All members must be invited to join by the Board of Directors. Membership eligibility may be achieved by a competitive nomination or a member may submit a name based on other significant contribution to the field of motion pictures. To be eligible for nomination, a film must be a Belgian production and open in the previous calendar year (from October 16 of the previous calendar year to October 15 of the following year) in Belgium and play for seven consecutive days.

In December, the Académie reveals the list of eligible releases; a DVD set with the catalog of films is also sent to the electors. Voters use an instant run-off voting ballot, with potential nominees rewarded in the single transferable vote tally for having strong supporters who rank them first. The winners are then determined by a second round of voting. All members are allowed to vote in most categories, except for the Honorary Magritte Award, whose recipients are determined by the Board of Directors of the Académie. After the nominations are revealed, in January, special screenings of the nominated films are shown.

Categories
Current awards

 Best Film: since 2011
 Best Director: since 2011
 Best Actor in a Leading Role: since 2011
 Best Actress in a Leading Role: since 2011
 Best Actor in a Supporting Role: since 2011
 Best Actress in a Supporting Role: since 2011
 Best Animated Short Film: since 2016
 Best Cinematography: since 2011
 Best Costume Design: since 2011
 Best Documentary Film: since 2011
 Best Editing: since 2011

 Best First Feature Film: since 2013
 Best Flemish Film: since 2012
 Best Foreign Film in Coproduction: since 2012
 Best Live Action Short Film: since 2016
 Best Original Score: since 2011
 Best Production Design: since 2011
 Best Screenplay: since 2011
 Best Sound: since 2011
 Most Promising Actor: since 2011
 Most Promising Actress: since 2011
 Honorary Magritte Award: since 2011

Retired awards
 Audience Award: 2011 to 2012
 Best Film in Coproduction: 2011 only
 Best Short Film: 2011 to 2015

Awards ceremonies
The following is a listing of all Magritte Awards ceremonies.

See also

Ensor Award (Flemish equivalent)
César Award (French equivalent)
Lumières Award
Joseph Plateau Award

References

External links

 
 
 Magritte Awards at RTBF

 
Belgian film awards
Awards established in 2010
2010 establishments in Belgium